Can't Blame a Girl for Trying is the debut extended play by American singer Sabrina Carpenter. It was released by Hollywood Records on April 8, 2014. On music provider iTunes, it was later replaced by her 2015 studio album which included all four tracks. The EP was produced by Brian Malouf, Jim McGorman, Robb Vallier, Matt Squire, Steve Tippeconic, Scott Harris, John Gordon and Julie Frost.

Musically, the album has a pop sound with folk. Its production consists on guitars, piano, drums and keyboards. In general, the album talks about love and teenage problems.

Can't Blame a Girl for Trying produced two singles, "Can't Blame a Girl for Trying", released on March 14, 2014 and "The Middle of Starting Over", released on August 19, 2014.

Background and recording
Carpenter became heavily involved with the Disney Channel in 2013, making various appearances on soundtracks like "Smile" for the album Disney Fairies: Faith, Trust And Pixie Dust" and "All You Need", featured on the Sofia the First soundtrack. In that same year, Sabrina signed a record deal with Hollywood Records to release her own music. Sabrina was planning to launch an EP and then release a studio album, she released an EP with four tracks and then she released a complete version of the EP plus eight new tracks in the next year.

Sabrina start recording songs for the EP in 2013 when she was filming for Girl Meets World until 2014. She worked with various such as Brian Malouf, Jim McGorman, and Matt Squire. She recorded "White Flag" at SOMD Studio in Los Angeles, California with Larry Goetz making the engineering and Matt Squire making the audio mixing. "Best Thing I Got" was recorded at Gordon Studio DK and was mixed by John Gordon and Sune Haansbaek. The two singles of the EP, "Can't Blame a Girl for Trying" and "The Middle of Starting Over" were both engineered by Chris Thompson and mixed by Malouf at Cookie Jar Recording in Sherman Oaks, California.

Music and lyrics
The final cut of Can't Blame a Girl for Trying contains four tracks. The album is a teen pop record full of acoustic and country vibes and it was compared to Taylor Swift's early albums. In all of the songs Sabrina talks about teenage love and issues. None of the songs were written by Sabrina.

Can't Blame a Girl for Trying begins with the title track "Can't Blame a Girl for Trying" an acoustic guitar-pop folk song who talks about making mistakes and being foolish in love; Sabrina says that the song "perfectly described being a 13-year-old girl and being a teenage girl". The second song and single, "The Middle of Starting Over" has country and teen pop influences. The song talks about moving on, start all over again and forget the mistakes. "The Middle of Starting Over" was compared to Taylor Swift's work in her early albums.

A folk-pop guitar-driven ballad, "White Flag" talks about changes in our daily life and that none of the bad things we do will last forever. The last track of the EP, "Best Thing I Got" is a piano pop song with drums and guitar. Lyrically, the song talks about love and "being a non-perfect girl who wants life to be full of freedom and learning ur own way of how to deal with problems".

Singles
"Can't Blame a Girl for Trying" is the lead single from the EP. It was released on March 14, 2014, onto iTunes and was premiered a day before exclusively on Radio Disney. The music video premiered on March 28. The song won a Radio Disney Music Award in the category "Best Crush Song."

The second single, "The Middle of Starting Over" was released on Radio Disney in July and it was available on August 19, 2014. The music video premiered on September 21.

Track listing

Notes
 signifies a co-producer
 signifies an additional producer
 signifies a vocal producer

Credits and personnel
Credits adapted from the liner notes of Can't Blame a Girl for Trying.

Recorded, engineered, mixed and mastered at 

 Sherman Oaks, California 
 Los Angeles, California 
 Gordon Studio DK
 Bernie Grundman Mastering

Performers and production

 Sabrina Carpenter – vocals 
 Brian Gardner – mastering 
 Brian Malouf – drum programming ; production, mixing, keyboards 
 Chris Thompson – engineering 
 Jim McGorman – glockenspiel, hand percurssion ; acoustic guitar, electric guitar, bass ; co-production, piano, keyboards 
 Robb Valler – co-production, backing vocals 
 Marc Slutsky – drums 
 Daniel Kalisher – mandolin 
 Michelle Moyer – backing vocals 
 Matt Squire – production, mixing, all instruments 
 Steve Tippeconic – additional production, all instruments 
 Scott Harris – additional production 
 Larry Goetz – all instruments, engineering 
 John Gordon – production, mixing, programming, guitars, piano, additional instruments 
 Sune Haansbaek – mixing, additional guitar 
 Julie Frost – vocal production 
 Kim Thomsen – drums 
 Mikkel Riber – bass

Design

 Rebecca Miller – photography
 Anabel Sinn – art direction, design
 Enny Joo – art direction
 Dave Snow - creative director

Charts

Release history

References

2014 debut EPs
Sabrina Carpenter albums
Hollywood Records EPs